Alexander Peak is a summit in the north end of the Haines Mountains 1 nautical mile (2 km) west of Buennagel Peak. Alexander Peak sits in the Ford Ranges, Marie Byrd Land, Antarctica. Probably first seen on aerial flights from Little America base by the Byrd Antarctic Expedition (1928–30), it was named by the Advisory Committee on Antarctic Names for C.D. Alexander, a member of the Byrd Antarctic Expedition (1933–35).

References
 

Mountains of Marie Byrd Land